Luigia "Gina" Lollobrigida  (4 July 1927 – 16 January 2023) was an Italian actress, photojournalist, artist and politician. She was one of the highest-profile European actresses of the 1950s and 1960s, a period in which she was an international sex symbol. She was among the last surviving high-profile international actors from the Golden Age of Hollywood cinema.

As her film career slowed, Lollobrigida established a second career as a photojournalist. In the 1970s she achieved a scoop by gaining access to Fidel Castro for an exclusive interview.

Lollobrigida continued as an active supporter of Italian and Italian-American causes, particularly the National Italian American Foundation (NIAF). In 2008 she received the NIAF Lifetime Achievement Award at the Foundation's Anniversary Gala. In 2013, she sold her jewellery collection and donated the nearly US$5 million from the sale to benefit stem-cell therapy research. She won the Henrietta Award at the 18th Golden Globe Awards. According to Italian newspapers, Gina Lollobrigida’s estimated net worth at her death was $215 million.

Youth
Born Luigia Lollobrigida in Subiaco in Lazio (about 40 miles from Rome), she was the daughter of a furniture maker and his wife. Her three sisters were Giuliana (1924-2005), Maria (1929-1982), and Fernanda (1930–1978). After the end of World War II in 1945, the family moved to Rome, where Lollobrigida took singing lessons, did some modelling, and participated in several beauty contests, placing third in the 1947 Miss Italy contest. In 1946, she began appearing in Italian films in minor roles.

In 1945 at age 18, Lollobrigida played a part in the comedy Santarellina by Eduardo Scarpetta at the Teatro della Concordia of Monte Castello di Vibio, the smallest theatre all'italiana in the world.

Acting career

Cinema
In 1950, Howard Hughes signed Lollobrigida on a preliminary seven-year contract to make three pictures a year. She refused the final terms of the contract, preferring to remain in Europe, and Hughes suspended her. Despite selling RKO Pictures in 1955, Hughes retained Lollobrigida's contract. The dispute prevented her from working in American movies filmed in the U.S. until 1959, but allowed for American productions shot in Europe, although Hughes often threatened legal action against the producers.

Her performance in the Italian romantic comedy Bread, Love and Dreams (Pane, amore e fantasia, 1953) led to its becoming a box-office success and her receiving a BAFTA nomination. Further she won a Nastro d'Argento award from the Italian National Syndicate of Film Journalists for her role in the picture. Lollobrigida appeared in The Wayward Wife (1953) and in Woman of Rome (1954). These were three of her most renowned Italian films, but she worked also in the French industry on such films as Fearless Little Soldier (Fanfan la Tulipe, 1952), Beauties of the Night (Les Belles de nuit, also 1952), and Le Grand Jeu (1954).

Her first widely seen English-language film, Beat the Devil (1953), was shot in Italy, and directed by John Huston. In this film she played the wife of Humphrey Bogart, with Jennifer Jones and Robert Morley as her costars. She then took part in the Italian-American production Crossed Swords (1954), co-starring with Errol Flynn. Her performance in The World's Most Beautiful Woman (also known as Beautiful But Dangerous, 1955) led to her receiving the first David di Donatello for Best Actress award. In this movie Lollobrigida played Italian soprano Lina Cavalieri and sang all the songs in the movie, including arias from Tosca, in her own voice. She had the principal female lead in the circus drama Trapeze (1956) directed by Carol Reed co-starring with Burt Lancaster and Tony Curtis and in The Hunchback of Notre Dame (1956), appeared as Esmeralda with Anthony Quinn as Quasimodo. The film was directed by Jean Delannoy.

She appeared in the French movie The Law (1959), alongside Yves Montand and Marcello Mastroianni; then, she co-starred with Frank Sinatra in Never So Few (1959) and with Yul Brynner in Solomon and Sheba (also 1959). The latter was the last film directed by King Vidor and features a dance routine which was supposed to depict an orgy scene. Brynner had been chosen to substitute for Tyrone Power, who died before the shots were completed.

In the romantic comedy Come September (1961), Lollobrigida had a leading role along with Rock Hudson, Sandra Dee, and Bobby Darin. It was a film for which she won a Golden Globe Award. She appeared, also in 1961, with Ernest Borgnine and Anthony Franciosa in the drama Go Naked in the World.

She attended the 1961 Academy Awards ceremony, hosted by Bob Hope, delivering the Academy Award for Best Director to Billy Wilder for the film The Apartment.

Jean Delannoy then directed her again, this time in Venere Imperiale (1962). She co-starred with Stephen Boyd and received Nastro d'Argento and David di Donatello awards. She co-starred with Sean Connery in the thriller Woman of Straw (1964), with Rock Hudson again in Strange Bedfellows (1965), and appeared with Alec Guinness in Hotel Paradiso (1966).

Lollobrigida starred in Buona Sera, Mrs. Campbell (1968) with Shelley Winters, Phil Silvers, Peter Lawford, and Telly Savalas. For this role, she was nominated for a Golden Globe Award and won a third David di Donatello award. Lollobrigida co-starred with Bob Hope in the comedy The Private Navy of Sgt. O'Farrell (1968) and also accompanied Hope on his visits to military troops overseas.

During this stage of her career, she rejected roles in many films, including Lady L (1965) with Tony Curtis, directed by George Cukor, due to conflicts with Cukor (the leading role then went to Sophia Loren); Five Branded Women (1960), directed by Martin Ritt (the leading role went to Silvana Mangano); and The Lady Without Camelias (1953), directed by Michelangelo Antonioni (the leading role went to Lucia Bosè). She later revealed regret for having refused a supporting role in La Dolce Vita (1960). The film's director, Federico Fellini, wanted to cast her in the film but, she explained, proposed projects were arriving too often at the time and her husband accidentally misplaced the script.

By the 1970s, her film career had slowed down. She appeared in King, Queen, Knave (1972), co-starring with David Niven, and in a few other poorly received productions in the early part of the decade. In 1973, she was a member of the jury at the 8th Moscow International Film Festival.

Television
In the mid-1980s, she starred in the television series Falcon Crest as Francesca Gioberti, a role originally written for Sophia Loren, who had turned it down. For the role, she received a third Golden Globe nomination. She also had a supporting role in the 1985 television miniseries Deceptions, co-starring with Stefanie Powers. The following year, she appeared as a guest star in the TV series The Love Boat.

Judging
In 1986, she was invited to head the jury at the 36th Berlin International Film Festival, which awarded the Golden Bear to Reinhard Hauff's film Stammheim. She said the majority decision was "prefabricated", and opposed it.

Photojournalism
By the end of the 1970s, Lollobrigida had embarked on what she developed into a successful second career as a photographic journalist. She photographed, among others, Paul Newman, Salvador Dalí, Henry Kissinger, David Cassidy, Audrey Hepburn, Ella Fitzgerald, and the Germany national football team. In 1974 she managed to obtain an exclusive interview with Cuban leader Fidel Castro. Between 1972 and 1994 she published six collections of her photographs, including the 1973 title Italia Mia.

Politics
In 1999, Lollobrigida unsuccessfully ran for election to the European Parliament as a candidate for The Democrats, a party led by Romano Prodi. In 2020, she publicly endorsed Pope Francis' view on LGBT rights. In the 2022 Italian general election, Lollobrigida, at the age of 95, attempted to win a seat in the Senate of the Republic, by standing for election as candidate for the Sovereign and Popular Italy (ISP), a newly-founded Eurosceptic alliance opposed to Mario Draghi, in Latina, Lazio. She was unsuccessful, as the party garnered only 1% of the constituency vote, below the 3% electoral threshold. In an interview with Corriere della Sera prior to the election, Lollobrigida said she was inspired by Mahatma Gandhi's "way of doing things". She also claimed to have been close to Indira Gandhi.

Personal life

In 1949 Lollobrigida married a Slovenian physician, Milko Škofič. Their only child, Andrea Milko (Milko Škofič, Jr.), was born on 28 July 1957. Škofič gave up the practice of medicine to become her manager. In 1960, Lollobrigida moved from her native Italy to Toronto, with Škofič and their son. The couple meant to solve the legal situation of their son who was considered stateless by the Italian bureaucracy. The couple divorced in 1971.

In October 2006, at age 79, she announced to Spain's ¡Hola! magazine her engagement to a 45-year-old Spanish businessman, Javier Rigau y Rafols.

They had met at a party in Monte Carlo in 1984 and had since become companions. The engagement was called off on 6 December 2006, reportedly because of the strain of intense media interest.

In 2006 Lollobrigida and Rigau signed a prenuptial agreement and married in Spain.

In January 2013, she started legal action against Rigau, claiming that her ex-boyfriend had staged a secret ceremony in which he "married" an imposter pretending to be her at a registry office in Barcelona. She said he intended to lay claim to her estate after her death. Lollobrigida accused Rigau of fraud, saying that he had earlier obtained the legal right to act on her behalf with a power of attorney, and carried out the plot to get extra power. "A while ago he convinced me to give him my power of attorney. He needed it for some legal affairs. But instead, I fear that he took advantage of the fact that I don't understand Spanish ... Who knows what he had me sign." In March 2017, she lost her court action, but subsequently said that she would appeal.

Lollobrigida had a habit of referring to herself in the third person.

Lollobrigida retired from filming in 1997. She told PARADE in April 2000: "I studied painting and sculpting at school and became an actress by mistake ... I've had many lovers and still have romances. I am very spoiled. All my life, I've had too many admirers." After retirement she divided her time between her house on Via Appia Antica in Rome and a villa in Monte Carlo. After 2009, she refused visitors to her home.

In 2013, Lollobrigida sold her jewelry collection through Sotheby's. She donated nearly $5 million to benefit stem-cell therapy.

In 2019, the Roman Rota, with the consent of Pope Francis, issued a declaration of nullity for her marriage with Rigau after a two-year review.

At the end of the 2010s, Andrea Piazzolla became Lollobrigida's main collaborator, general director and trustee of some Monegasque real estate and financial societies. In July 2020 he was charged for circumvention of an incapable person.

In 2021, the Italian Supreme Court of Cassation, at the request of her son, ruled that Lollobrigida should have a legal guardian appointed to manage her affairs and prevent predation. Although the court determined she was mentally capable, medical evidence had indicated that there was "a weakening in her correct perception of reality" and that she was in a state of "vulnerability".

Lollobrigida died at a clinic in Rome on 16 January 2023, at the age of 95. She is buried in her birthplace, Subiaco, Lazio.

Awards and nominations
Lollobrigida won three David di Donatello, two Nastro d'Argento, and six Bambi awards. She was nominated three times for the Golden Globe and won once in 1961 as World Film Favorite – Female. She was nominated once for a BAFTA award.

In 1985, she was nominated as an officer of France's Ordre des Arts et des Lettres by Jack Lang, for her achievements in photography and sculpture.

Lollobrigida was awarded the Légion d'honneur by François Mitterrand.

On 16 October 1999, Lollobrigida was nominated as a Goodwill Ambassador of the UN Food and Agriculture Organization.

On 1 February 2018, Lollobrigida received a star on the Hollywood Walk of Fame.

Books
 Italia mia (1973) —a collection of photographs across Italy 
 The Philippines (1976) —a collection of photographs across the Philippines
 Wonder of Innocence (1994) — a book of photographs 
 Sculptures (2003) 
 Gina Lollobrigida Photographer (2009) - a book of her photography 
 Gina Lollobrigida "Vissi D'Arte" (2008) - a book of her sculptures and some of her drawings and paintings

Filmography
 Sources:

Cinema

Television

Notes

References

External links

 
 
 
 
 Photographs and literature
 Obituary at The Guardian, by John Francis Lane, 16 January 2023
 

1927 births
2023 deaths
People from Subiaco, Lazio
Italian actor-politicians
Italian film actresses
Italian television actresses
Recipients of the Legion of Honour
Italian photographers
Italian activists
Italian expatriates in Monaco
20th-century Italian actresses
Illeists
David di Donatello winners
Nastro d'Argento winners
David di Donatello Career Award winners
Italian sculptors
Italian expatriates in the United States
Expatriate actresses in the United States
Women photojournalists
Italian women photographers
United Service Organizations entertainers